Ronald Alfred "Roy" Davies (23 August 1924 – 10 December 1973) was a South African professional footballer.

Career

Davies played for Germiston Callies in his native South Africa, before his career was interrupted by the Second World War. Following the conflict, Davies signed for Scottish club Clyde, where he spent four years and made 60 league appearances, also playing in the 1949 Scottish Cup Final.

Joining English team Luton Town in 1951, Davies played 171 games for the club before moving into semi-retirement with Bedford Town and Weymouth.

References

1924 births
1973 deaths
Sportspeople from Cape Town
South African soccer players
Scottish Football League players
English Football League players
Clyde F.C. players
Luton Town F.C. players
Bedford Town F.C. players
Association football wingers
Weymouth F.C. players
Germiston Callies F.C. players
South African cricketers
Bedfordshire cricketers
South African expatriate soccer players
South African expatriate sportspeople in England
South African expatriate sportspeople in Scotland
Expatriate footballers in England
Expatriate footballers in Scotland